The discography of South Korean artist MC Mong consists of nine studio albums, one compilation album, one extended play (EP), sixteen singles (including two digital singles), and fifteen collaborations with other artists.

Albums

Studio albums

Compilation albums

EPs

Singles

Other charted songs

Others works

Music videos

Notes

References

Hip hop discographies
Discographies of South Korean artists